Invisible Child may refer to:
 Invisible Child (film), 1999 film
 Invisible Child: Poverty, Survival & Hope in an American City, 2021 nonfiction book by Andrea Elliott